Linda Burdette is a former head gymnastics coach at West Virginia University. She coached at WVU from 1975 to 2011, posting a 644-263-4 record.  Starting in 1980, she coached her teams to 35 winning seasons. Her teams also reached the NCAA regionals 33 times. In 1995, 1999, and 2000, her teams qualified for the NCAA Nationals. She led her teams to four Atlantic 10 championships and six EAGL championships. She was a five time EAGL coach of the year winner, and served on the NCAA's Women's Gymnastics competition committee.

References

Year of birth missing (living people)
Living people
College women's gymnastics coaches in the United States